Al-Bahr al-Madeed fi Tafsir al-Qur'an al-Majeed or shortly named al-Baḥr al-Madīd, better known as Tafsir Ibn 'Ajiba, is a Sunni Sufi tafsir work, authored by the Maliki-Ash'ari scholar Ahmad ibn 'Ajiba (d. 1224/1809), who was following the Shadhili-Darqawi order.

It is the only traditional Qur'anic commentary which gives both exoteric exegesis and mystical, spiritual esoteric allusion (ishara) for each verse of the Qur'an, combines traditional exegesis with spiritual contemplation, exploring the outer and inner meanings of the sacred text.

The reader will find commentary, both exoteric and esoteric, on most verses of the Qur'anic text, and will discover the depths at which Qur'anic discourse has been understood by the Sufis over the centuries and up to the author's era.

Ibn Ajiba's tafsir was written in about five years.

Background 
Ibn 'Ajiba relied on several earlier sources for his interpretation, as he himself mentioned at the end of his tafsir, including the following:
 Anwar al-Tanzil wa Asrar al-Ta'wil by Nasir al-Din al-Baydawi (d. 685/1286).
 Irshad al-'Aql al-Salim ila Mazaya al-Kitab al-Karim by Ebussuud Efendi (d. 982/1574).
 Hashiya (footnote) on Tafsir al-Jalalayn by Abu Zayd 'Abd al-Rahman al-Fasi (d. 1096/1685).
 Al-Tashil li-'Ulum al-Tanzil by Ibn Juzayy (d. 741/1340).
 Al-Kashf wa al-Bayan by Abu Ishaq al-Tha'labi (d. 427/1035).
 Lata'if al-Isharat by Abu al-Qasim al-Qushayri (d. 465/1074).

As for his Hadith sources, they are the six major Hadith collections (al-Kutub al-Sittah) of Sunni Islam and their valuable commentaries.

His linguistic sources are: Al-Alfiyya, al-Kafiyya al-Shafiyya by Ibn Malik, al-Tasheel by Ibn Hisham; and the books of Qur'an meanings, such as Ma'ani al-Qur'an by al-Farra' and al-Zajjaj; and also the dictionaries/lexicons books, such as al-Sihah by al-Jawhari, and Asas al-Balagha by al-Zamakhshari.

Most of the Sufi sources of his tafsir are from North Africa, al-Andalus, or Egypt. He quotes from scholars such as al-Junayd, al-Qushayri, al-Ghazali, al-Shadhili, al-Mursi, al-Sakandari, al-Darqawi, Muhammad al-Buzidi, al-Jili, al-Shushtari, al-Bistami, Zarruq and Ruzbihan al-Baqli. Ibn 'Ajiba's quotations from Ruzbihan have hitherto gone unnoticed, because Ibn 'Ajiba referred to him as “al-Wartajbi”.

About the author 

Ahmad ibn 'Ajiba was a Shadhili-Darqawi shaykh who wrote over 30 Islamic Sufi books. He was born in a village near Tetouan to a sharifian family, who originated from an Andalusian mountain village called 'Ayn al-Rumman (“the Spring of Pomegranates”). He showed from an early age an aptitude for the religious sciences and became a traditional 'alim. His orientation changed when he read  (the wisdoms or aphorisms of Ibn 'Ata' Allah al-Sakandari) with the commentary by Ibn 'Abbad al-Rundi (d. 792 AH/1390 CE), who contributed to the spread of the Shadhiliyya order in the Maghreb (northwest Africa).

Notes

See also 

 Tafsir al-Nisaburi
 List of tafsir works
 List of Sunni books

References

Further reading 
 
 
 سير الركائب النجيبة بأخبار الشيخ ابن عجيبة، تأليف: أحمد بن محمد بن الصديق الغماري
 الشيخ أحمد بن عجيبة ومنهجه في التفسير، تأليف: حسن عزوزي
 أعمال ندوة: الشيخ أحمد ابن عجيبة المفكر والعالم الصوفي
 التصوف كوعي وممارسة: دراسة في الفلسفة الصوفية عند أحمد بن عجيبة

External links 
 Tafsir Ibn 'Ajiba 
 Esoteric Hermeneutic of Ibn 'Ajiba
 Surat al-Kawthar: Sufi Tafsir: ibn 'Ajiba
 Note From The Translator: Ibn 'Ajiba's Tafsir of Verses 1-5 of Surat al-Kahf
 Divine Love in the Moroccan Sufi Tradition: Ibn 'Ajība (d. 1224/1809) and His Oceanic Exegesis of the Qur'ān
 The Philosophical Method in the Sufi Qur'anic commentaries 

Ibn Ajiba
Sufi literature
Quranic exegesis
Ibn Ajiba